Gentiana autumnalis, the pine barren gentian, is a  tall flowering plant in the Gentianaceae family. It is native to eastern North America coastal pinebarrens from New Jersey to South Carolina. Fire suppression, invasive weeds, and the altering of natural water flows all pose threats to rare native populations of G. autumnalis.

References

autumnalis
Endemic flora of the United States
Flora of the Northeastern United States
Flora of the Southeastern United States
Plants described in 1776
Taxa named by Carl Linnaeus
Flora without expected TNC conservation status